At least 32 people were killed and 71 wounded in the 27 January 2012 Baghdad bombing. A suicide bomber targeting Shias detonated his vehicle at a funeral tent in Zaafaraniyah district in the south of Baghdad. The procession was being held for a local real estate broker who had been murdered by unidentified gunmen the previous day.

References

2012 murders in Iraq
21st-century mass murder in Iraq
Suicide car and truck bombings in Iraq
Mass murder in 2012
Suicide bombings in Baghdad
Terrorist incidents in Iraq in 2012
2010s in Baghdad
Violence against Shia Muslims in Iraq
Terrorist incidents in Baghdad
January 2012 crimes
January 2012 events in Iraq